Hurdlow railway station was near to the hamlet of Hurdlow within Hartington Middle Quarter civil parish, to the south east of Buxton, Derbyshire on the LNWR line to Ashbourne and the south.

History

It opened for goods in 1833 on the Cromford and High Peak Railway from Whaley Bridge to Cromford. Passenger service began in 1856, but it closed in 1877. When it became part of the Ashbourne Line, the LNWR opened it again in 1894.

In some timetables it was listed as Hurdlow for Longnor and Monyash,; the platforms and buildings were of timber construction, as in all the stations on the line.

From here to Ashbourne, the gradients would become much easier, though this was countered by the curves as the line endeavoured to follow the contours.

Easter Tuesdays were particularly busy with special trains laid on for the Flagg Moor Steeplechase.

The station closed to passengers on 15 August 1949. but continued in occasional use for workmen until the line closed in 1954. Although the station buildings and platforms have been demolished, the site lies at a point where the High Peak Trail, running along the old rail track bed, passes under a bridge carrying the road from Longnor to Monyash.

Route

References

See also
 Cromford and High Peak Railway

Disused railway stations in Derbyshire
Railway stations in Great Britain opened in 1856
Railway stations in Great Britain closed in 1949
Former London and North Western Railway stations